Rayalaseema Diocese is a diocese of Church of South India in Andhra Pradesh state of India.The diocese one among the 22 dioceses of Church of South India.

History
Rayalaseema diocese was carved on 15 July 1950 out of then Cuddapah Diocese and Anantapur-Kurnool Diocese of the Church of South India.

Bishops of the Diocese
*Anantapur-Kurnool Diocese

*Cuddapah Diocese

*Rayalaseema Diocese (Integration of Anantapur-Kurnool Diocese and Cuddapah Diocese)

References

Further reading
 
 
 
 
 
 

Rayalaseema
Christianity in Andhra Pradesh
Church of South India